Frédéric Cloutier (born May 14, 1981) is a Canadian-born Italian professional ice hockey goaltender who plays for HC Merano of the Alps Hockey League.

Undrafted by a National Hockey League (NHL) team, Cloutier played for the Bridgeport Sound Tigers. He signed with their NHL affiliate, the New York Islanders on January 5, 2006, and spent the rest of the season with them.

He played for Canada at the Spengler Cup in Switzerland.

Married to an Italian woman, Cloutier obtained Italian citizenship and began playing internationally for Italy in 2016.

Awards and honours
Jacques Plante Memorial Trophy - QMJHL Best GAA (2.50) (2000–01)
QMJHL First Team All-Star (2000–01)
ECHL Most Valuable Player (2001–02)
ECHL Rookie of the Year (2001–02)
Coppa Italia 2010
Supercoppa Italiana 2009, 2010
Alps Hockey League 2017-2018
Mestis  Runner-up (2014–15)

References

External links

1981 births
Acadie–Bathurst Titan players
Asiago Hockey 1935 players
SC Bietigheim-Bissingen players
Bridgeport Sound Tigers players
Canadian ice hockey goaltenders
Graz 99ers players
Houston Aeros (1994–2013) players
Italian ice hockey players
KooKoo players
Living people
Louisiana IceGators (ECHL) players
Milwaukee Admirals players
Pensacola Ice Pilots players
Rockford IceHogs (UHL) players
Shawinigan Cataractes players
Starbulls Rosenheim players
Ritten Sport players
Canadian expatriate ice hockey players in Austria
Canadian expatriate ice hockey players in Italy
Canadian expatriate ice hockey players in Germany